Thomas Booker is an American actor, writer, director, and improvisational comedian. He is best known for his role as Keel Lorenz in Neon Genesis Evangelion: Death & Rebirth its sequel The End of Evangelion and the Amazon redub of Rebuild of Evangelion. He is also the owner of The Institution Theater in Austin, Texas.

Early life
Booker was born in Tulsa, Oklahoma where he graduated from Nathan Hale High School. As an undergraduate, he was "Top Dawg", University of Oklahoma's mascot. He moved to Chicago and, in 1986, began studying improvisation at The Second City Training Center before studying with legendary improv guru Del Close at ImprovOlympic.

Career
Booker moved to Los Angeles in 1991 and formed Theater-A-Go-Go! with Laura Hall. In 1994 Booker made his television debut as Jinxo in the Babylon 5 episode, "Grail". He also began teaching improv and sketch writing at The Second City Training Center in Los Angeles. His movie debut came in a minor role in the 1995 film Jury Duty. In 2001 he had the voice role of Keel Lorenz in Neon Genesis Evangelion: Death & Rebirth and its sequel The End of Evangelion he later reprised the role in the Amazon redub of Rebuild of Evangelion. He had another minor role in the 1998 mockumentary The Thin Pink Line as a wet underwear contestant. Tom also co-wrote and co-directed (with producing partner Jon Kean) the feature film Kill the Man starring Luke Wilson, which premiered at the 1999 Sundance Film Festival. He also played the role of Biily Bob in the film.

Filmography

Film and television

Web

References 

Male actors from Oklahoma
Living people
University of Oklahoma alumni
20th-century American male actors
21st-century American male actors
Year of birth missing (living people)